Dolichoderus evolans is an extinct species of Miocene ant in the genus Dolichoderus. Described by Zhang in 1989, the fossilised species was discovered in China, where a possible queen has been described.

References

†
Miocene insects
Fossil taxa described in 1989
†
Fossil ant taxa